is a Japanese video game music composer. He works primarily on games developed by Level-5.

Works
OverBlood 2 (1998) – sound effects
Dark Cloud (2000)
Dark Chronicle (2002)
Rogue Galaxy (2005)
Professor Layton and the Curious Village (2007)
Professor Layton and the Diabolical Box (2007)
Professor Layton and the Unwound Future (2008)
Professor Layton's London Life (2009)
Professor Layton and the Last Specter (2009)
Professor Layton and the Eternal Diva (2009)
Professor Layton and the Miracle Mask (2011)
Professor Layton vs. Phoenix Wright: Ace Attorney (2012)
Professor Layton and the Azran Legacy (2013)
Layton's Mystery Journey (2017)
Yo-kai Watch Jam: Yo-kai Academy Y – Waiwai Gakuen Seikatsu (2020) – with Kenichiro Saigo

References

External links

MobyGames profile

1973 births
Japanese composers
Japanese male composers
Japanese music arrangers
Living people
Musicians from Tokyo
Video game composers